Rhodactina incarnata is a species of secotioid fungus in the family Boletaceae. It is found in the sandy soil of dry, Dipterocarpaceae-dominated forests in Chang Mai, northern Thailand. The fungus was described as new to science in 2006, becoming the second species in genus Rhodactina. The specific epithet incarnata, derived from the Latin for "flesh-colored", refers to the fruitbody color.

References

External links

Boletaceae
Fungi described in 2006
Fungi of Asia
Secotioid fungi